Dironidae is a family of nudibranchs, marine gastropod molluscs, in the clade Euthyneura. There are no subfamilies in Dironidae.

Genera 
 Dirona MacFarland, in Cockerell & Eliot, 1905 - type genus

References